Lubná is a municipality and village in Rakovník District in the Central Bohemian Region of the Czech Republic. It has about 1,000 inhabitants.

Notable people
Antonín Kohout (1919–2013), cellist

References

External links

 (in Czech)

Villages in Rakovník District